The Zionist occupation government, Zionist occupational government or Zionist-occupied government (ZOG), sometimes also referred to as the Jewish occupational government (JOG), is an antisemitic conspiracy theory claiming Jews secretly control the governments of Western states. It is a contemporary variation on the centuries-old belief in an international Jewish conspiracy. According to believers, a secret Zionist organization controls international banks, and through them the governments, in order to collude against white, Christian, or Islamic interests.

The expression is used by white supremacist, white nationalist, far-right, nativist or antisemitic groups in Europe and the United States, as well as by ultra-nationalists such as Pamyat in Russia and various far-right groups including the Freemen, Identity Christians and the Ku Klux Klan.

The word Zionist in "Zionist occupation government" should not be confused with the ideology of Zionism, the movement for support of a Jewish state in the Land of Israel. As the conspiracy theorists chiefly name countries outside that area, the usage of Zionist in this context is misleading because it is intended to portray Jews as conspirators who aim to control the world as depicted in the forged Protocols of the Elders of Zion.

Origins 
The association of Jews to the control of economic forces is the modern resurgence of an old stereotype, that of the "greedy Jewish merchant" which has been present in the Christian world since the Middle Ages. The conspiracy theory illustrates a specifically American far-right agrarian preoccupation, namely the vital possibility of extinction allegedly faced by the rural world, seen as the backbone of America, a danger caused by a remote, centralized and power-hungry metropolitan elite corrupted by "alien" influences.

History 

The British fascist Arnold Leese already had the habit of referring to the "Jewish government" of his own nation in the interwar and postwar decades, while Nazis under the Weimar Republic dismissed a so-called "Jewish" hand behind that regime. In late 19th-century France, the insinuation that the French government was in the power of the Jews was a commonplace claim in anti-republican discourse.

An early appearance of the term was in a 1976 article, "Welcome to ZOG-World", attributed to an American neo-Nazi named Eric Thomson, although Canadian white nationalists used the term "ZOG" as well. It also features as the main theme in the 1978 book The Turner Diaries written by William Luther Pierce, founder of the National Alliance, a white nationalist organization. The term came to the attention of a larger audience in a 27 December 1984 article in The New York Times about robberies committed in California and Washington by a white supremacist group called The Order. According to the newspaper, the crimes "were conducted to raise money for a war upon the United States Government, which the group calls 'ZOG', or Zionist Occupation Government". In 1985, the Oregon-based far-right group Posse Comitatus claimed: "Our nation is now completely under the control of the International Invisible government of World Jewry."

The Order of the Silent Brotherhood was an offshoot of the Aryan Nations, an organization founded in the early 1970s by Richard Girnt Butler; the latter had since the 1950s been associated with another antisemitic group, the Church of Jesus Christ Christian. Both of these groups trace their origins to antisemitic activists such as Gerald L.K. Smith and have interacted with the Ku Klux Klan. The term appeared extensively in Aryan Nations literature. In December 1984, Newsweek magazine reported that the Aryan Nations had set up an electronic bulletin board system called "Aryan Nation Liberty Net" to offer information for the locations of Communist Party USA offices and "ZOG informers".

In 1996, the Aryan Nations posted on its website an "Aryan Declaration of Independence", stating that "the history of the present Zionist Occupied Government of the United States of America is a history of repeated injuries and usurpations [...] [all] having a direct object—the establishment of an absolute tyranny over these states." Claiming that "the eradication of the White race and its culture" is "one of its foremost purposes", the "ZOG" is accused of relinquishing powers of government to private corporations, white traitors and ruling class Jewish families. It accused "ZOG" Jews of subverting the constitutional rule of law; responsibility for post-Civil War Reconstruction; subverting the monetary system with the Federal Reserve System, confiscating land and property; limiting freedoms of speech, religion and gun ownership; murdering, kidnapping and imprisoning patriots; abdicating national sovereignty to the United Nations; political repression; wasteful bureaucracy; loosening restrictions on immigration and drug trafficking; raising taxes; polluting the environment; commandeering the military, mercenaries and police; denying Aryan cultural heritage; and inciting immigrant insurrections.

Since 1996, the term has spread in usage and is now popular with many other antisemitic organizations. Swedish Neo-Nazis say that Jews—in what they call the Swedish Zionist occupied government—are importing immigrants to "dilute the blood of the white race". The antisemitic website Jew Watch claims that the entire spectrum of Western nations and other countries are being ruled by "Zionist Occupation Governments".

Slovak politician Marian Kotleba, whose party (People's Party Our Slovakia) won two  seats in the European Parliament in the 2019 election, claims that the "Z. O. G." controls Slovak politics.

Conspiracy theories 
A variety of plots gravitating around the original conspiracy theory were imagined by activists, one stating for instance that as many as 4,000 Jews were warned of the September 11 attacks before they happened. Believers also claim that ZOG-like forces control the American foreign policy. Despite their own singularities, most ZOG theories involve the idea of a Jewish power over the finance or banking, including one imagining a Jewish control on the Federal Reserve.

Neo-Nazi David Lane developed his version of the white genocide conspiracy theory in his  White Genocide Manifesto, the origin of the later use of the term. Lane claimed that the government policies of many Western countries had the intent of destroying white European culture and making white people an "extinct species". Lane—a founding member of the organization The Order—criticized miscegenation, abortion, homosexuality, Jewish control of the media, "multi-racial sports" and the legal repercussions against those who "resist genocide" and the ZOG that he said controls the United States and the other majority-white countries and which encourages "white genocide".

See also 

 Andinia Plan
 Antisemitic canard
 Blood libel
 Cultural Bolshevism
 Cultural Marxism conspiracy theory
 Doctors' plot
 Dreyfus affair
 The Eternal Jew (art exhibition)
 The Eternal Jew (book)
 The Eternal Jew (film)
 The Foundations of the Nineteenth Century
 Franklin Prophecy
 The International Jew
 Jewish Bolshevism
 Jewish question
 Judeo-Masonic conspiracy theory
 Kosher tax conspiracy theory
 New World Order (conspiracy theory)
 The Protocols of the Elders of Zion
 QAnon
 Reich Ministry of Public Enlightenment and Propaganda
 Rootless cosmopolitan
 Stab-in-the-back myth
 Żydokomuna

References

Bibliography

External links 
 .
 .
 .

Conspiracy theories involving Jews
Neo-Nazi concepts
Patriot movement